Connall Courtney (born Newry, County Down, Northern Ireland) is a Motorcycle Racer. In 2017 he competes in the British & Irish Superbike Championship in the Moto3 Class.

In 2015 in his first full year of racing he won both Irish & Ulster Junior Championships.

In 2016 Connall rode for Ian Lougher's Team ILR in the Standard Moto3 Class in the British Championship.

In 2017 he competes in the British & Irish Superbike Championship in the Moto3 Class.

References

External links
http://www.newsletter.co.uk/sport/motorcycling/teenage-prospect-conall-courtney-in-european-junior-cup-wildcard-chance-1-6986595
http://www.moderntyres.ie/cc-racing-wins-again
http://www.irishsuperbikeracing.com/2016/12/connall-courtney-to-continue-in-bsb.html

British motorsport people
Year of birth missing (living people)
Living people